Mohd Hafiszuan Salehuddin (born 21 June 1987) is a Malaysian footballer who is currently playing for Terengganu City in the Malaysia FAM League. His playing position is as a midfielder, but can also operate as a defender.

Career
Hafiszuan started his professional career in Perak FA youth squad. Starting from the 2009 season, he was one of several Perak youth players promoted to main squad after the exodus of Perak players to other teams. He signed to play for Perlis in early 2011, but returned to Perak on loan in August 2011 for Perak's Malaysia Cup campaign.

He was not retained in the Perlis squad for the 2012 Malaysia Premier League campaign.
In April 2012 he joint Felda United FC. In Second Transfer window 2013 he signed to KL SPA FC.

On 29 November 2016, he signed with Perlis FA.

References

External links
 Mohd Hafiszuan profile at Seladang.net
 

1987 births
Living people
Malaysian footballers
Perak F.C. players
Perlis FA players
People from Perak
Malaysian people of Malay descent
Association football midfielders